Keith Lincoln Ware (23 November 1915 – 13 September 1968) was a United States Army major general, and a Medal of Honor recipient of World War II. Ware was killed in action in 1968 while commanding the 1st Infantry Division during the Vietnam War.

Early life and education
Ware was born in Denver, Colorado on 23 November 1915. He graduated from South High School and worked at a variety of jobs to help support his family.

Military career

World War II
Ware was drafted into the United States Army in July 1941. He was sent to Officer Candidate School in 1942, emerging a platoon leader stationed at Fort Ord, California. He saw extensive service in the European Theater of Operations during World War II, rose to the rank of lieutenant colonel by December 1944, and was appointed to command the 1st Battalion, 15th Infantry Regiment, 3rd Infantry Division.

On 26 December 1944, Ware's battalion was attacking a heavily fortified German hilltop position. Finding one of his assault companies stalled and digging in under heavy fire, Ware went forward and made a close reconnaissance of the German positions, deliberately drawing their fire in order to determine their location. After two hours, he returned to the company and organized a small force of eleven men including two officers and a tank in order to renew the attack. Leading the advance, he personally assaulted four enemy machine guns, enabling the tank and the rest of his detachment to destroy the German position. Ware was wounded, and five soldiers of his group were killed before the hill was secured. In April 1945, he was awarded the Medal of Honor for his heroism.

Interbellum

Unlike most draftees, Ware remained in the army after demobilization, becoming a career soldier and one of the first former draftees to reach general officer rank.

Ware remained in Europe and took part in the post-war occupation of Germany. He then attended the United States Army Command and General Staff College, after which he was assigned to the Military District of Washington. During this assignment he met his future wife, Joyce; they were married in May 1947.

Ware attended the European Staff Officers' Course at Columbia University, and then studied at George Washington University in preparation for a teaching assignment. Ware was then assigned to the United States Military Academy as an instructor in psychology and leadership, after which he attended the Armed Forces Staff College.

After a posting in South Korea from 1955 to 1957, Ware attended the National War College. He then served as an army congressional liaison and completed an assignment in Europe. In 1963 Ware was assigned as assistant division commander of the 2nd Armored Division at Fort Hood, Texas, and was promoted to brigadier general. From 1964 to 1967 Ware was the army's deputy chief of information and then chief of information. In 1966 he was promoted to major general.

Vietnam War
Ware volunteered for service in Vietnam and arrived in South Vietnam in early 1968, serving as the deputy commander of II Field Force. On the morning of 31 January 1968, at the start of the Tet Offensive, II Field Force commander Lieutenant General Frederick C. Weyand directed Ware to establish a tactical command post at Camp Lê Văn Duyệt, next to the Army of the Republic of Vietnam's Capital Military District headquarters. Once operational this headquarters, known as Hurricane Forward, would assume tactical control over all United States units entering the Saigon–Gia Định Province zone. Following this, Ware was assigned to command the 1st Infantry Division in March 1968.

Death
On 13 September 1968, during the Battle of Lộc Ninh, elements of the 1st Infantry Division were preparing to attack Hill 222, 6 km north of the town. Ware's command group were flying in his command and control helicopter to view the battle when heavy anti-aircraft fire brought the helicopter down 5 km south of Lộc Ninh. Ware, his three command staff, and the four helicopter crew were all killed in the crash. Ware became the second United States Army general officer to die in the Vietnam War, after Brigadier General Alfred Judson Force Moody died of a heart attack in South Vietnam on 19 March 1967. On 25 October 1968, Ware was posthumously awarded the Distinguished Service Cross.

Ware is buried in Arlington National Cemetery.

Legacy
The U.S. Army's annual Awards for Journalism are named for him.
Ware Elementary School in Fort Riley, Kansas
Ware Hall, 1-15 IN battalion command post at Fort Benning, Georgia
Ware Hall, the Kelley Hill Education Center (building 9004) at Fort Benning, Georgia.
Ware Hall, a lodging facility at Fort Hood, Texas
A parade field at Fort Riley, Kansas
A shooting range at Fort Benning, Georgia

Ware's name is inscribed on the Vietnam War Memorial ("The Wall") on panel 44W.

Military awards
Ware's military decorations and awards include:

Medal of Honor citation

The President of the United States in the name of The Congress takes pleasure in presenting the MEDAL OF HONOR to

for service as set forth in the following

CITATION:

See also

List of Medal of Honor recipients for World War II

References

External links

 (Includes DSC and MoH citations.)

1915 births
1968 deaths
United States Army personnel of World War II
American military personnel killed in the Vietnam War
Burials at Arlington National Cemetery
Joint Forces Staff College alumni
National War College alumni
Recipients of the Distinguished Service Cross (United States)
Recipients of the Silver Star
Recipients of the Croix de Guerre (France)
United States Army Command and General Staff College alumni
United States Army generals
United States Army Medal of Honor recipients
World War II recipients of the Medal of Honor
United States Army personnel of the Vietnam War